Gonne may refer to:

 A medieval hand cannon
 Maud Gonne (1866–1953), English-born Irish revolutionary
 Iseult Gonne (1894–1954), daughter of Maud Gonne and Lucien Millevoye

See also
 Gone (disambiguation)